The Zugerberg is a mountain overlooking Zug and Lake Zug in the Zug. It lies approximately halfway between Lake Zug and Lake Ägeri.

The Zugerbergbahn funicular connects the Zugerberg from Zug. The upper station is located at a height of 925 metres and is a popular vantage point as well as a recreational area. The summit proper is entirely wooded.

A road pass named Sätteli (975 m) is located north of the summit.

References

External links

Zugerberg on Hikr

Mountain passes of Switzerland
Mountain passes of the canton of Zug
Mountains of the canton of Zug
Mountains of Switzerland
One-thousanders of Switzerland